FBR may refer to:

Science, medicine, and technology 
 Fast breeder reactor
 Fluidized bed reactor
 Foreign body response
 Full Bridge Rectifier

Other uses 
 Beveren railway station's station code
 FBR Capital Markets, an American investment banking firm
 Federal Board of Revenue, central revenue collection agency of Pakistan
 Fortnite Battle Royale, a video game
 Foundation for Biomedical Research, an American animal welfare organization
 Free Burma Rangers, a Burmese humanitarian organization
 Friedman Billings Ramsey, an American real estate investment trust
 Fueled by Ramen, an American record label